"Something 'bout the Kiss" is Namie Amuro's 14th single under the Avex Trax label, released on September 1, 1999, taken her fourth studio album Genius 2000.

Overview 
"Something 'bout the Kiss" is Amuro's first song to be produced by American producer Dallas Austin and show a more American influence in her music. The second track, "You are the One", is a duet featuring Imajin, an American R&B group. Two months later, the single was released as a limited vinyl.

Track listing 
12 cm Single
 Something 'bout the Kiss – 4:27
 You Are the One featuring Imajin – 5:33
 Something 'bout the Kiss (The All Out Mix) – 5:54
 Something 'bout the Kiss (Instrumental) – 4:25

8 cm Single
 Something 'bout the Kiss – 4:27
 You Are the One featuring Imajin – 5:33
 Something 'bout the Kiss (Instrumental) – 4:25

Commercial tie-in 
Something 'bout the Kiss was the theme song of a commercial for Kose featuring Namie herself.

Charts 
The 12 cm version debut at #3 with 130,510 copies sold in its first week and it sold 253,500 copies. The 8 cm version opened at #7 with 49,160 units sold it sold 115,880 copies. Both versions charted for 8 weeks. If both versions' sales are combined, Something 'bout the Kiss sold a total of 369,380 units. Both editions were certified gold by the RIAJ.(physical, 8 cm): Gold

The 12 cm version of the single was the 87th best-selling single of 1999. The 8 cm version did not appear on the yearly chart.

Production

Something 'bout the Kiss
 Production – Dallas Austin
 Arrangement – Dallas Austin
 Writers – Dallas Austin, O.Titi, Chan Hai
 Mixing – Alvin Speights
 Remixing – Dallas Austin

You are the One 
 Production – Tetsuya Komoro
 Arrangement – Tetsuya Komoro
 Writers – Tetsuya Komoro
 Chorus – imajin

References 

Songs about kissing
1999 singles
Namie Amuro songs
Songs written by Dallas Austin
1999 songs
Avex Trax singles
Song recordings produced by Dallas Austin